Aphomia sabella, the greater date moth, is a species of snout moth in the genus Aphomia. It was described by George Hampson in 1901 and is known from the Persian Gulf, Algeria and Iran. It was first recorded in Spain in 1999.

The wingspan is about 34 mm for males and 40 mm for females.

The larvae have been recorded feeding on Phoenix dactylifera.

References

Moths described in 1901
Tirathabini
Moths of Asia
Moths of Africa
Moths of Europe